The 1859 revival may refer to a number of different Christian revivals:

 1859 Ulster revival
 1859 Welsh revival
 The 1857–59 revival in the United States, considered to be the start of the Third Great Awakening